The Taft Coliseum is a 5,003-permanent seat multi-purpose arena located at the Ohio Expo Center and State Fairgrounds in Columbus, Ohio.

History
It opened in 1918 and is nicknamed "The Barn". The facility hosted the 1929 NCAA Wrestling Championships.

The Coliseum has become a legendary and traditional high school basketball venue. It hosted OHSAA central district and regional playoffs in boys' High School basketball until 2013, when the Central District Athletic Board opted to move games to Ohio Dominican University. During each fall and winter the Coliseum is also home to CAHA youth hockey. 

It was also once home to the Ohio State University men's basketball team, Columbus Horizon CBA basketball team, Columbus Thunderbolts Arena Football League team, and the Columbus Stars and Columbus Chill ice hockey teams. 

The Barn was renovated in 2005 to include new scoreboards, the addition of shot clocks above the backboards, a fresh coat of paint, and new rest rooms. On July 28, 2010, the Coliseum was renamed to honor Bob Taft, the 67th Governor of Ohio.

References

External links
Ohio Expo Center

Basketball venues in Columbus, Ohio
College wrestling venues in the United States
Continental Basketball Association venues
Defunct college basketball venues in the United States
Indoor arenas in Columbus, Ohio
Indoor ice hockey venues in Ohio
Ohio State Buckeyes sports venues
Sports venues in Columbus, Ohio
Wrestling venues in Ohio
1918 establishments in Ohio
Sports venues completed in 1908